The third season of the American television series Raising Hope premiered on October 2, 2012, on Fox. The season moved to a new time slot, airing on Tuesday at 8pm ET followed by the new comedy series Ben and Kate and The Mindy Project. This season consisted of 22 episodes.

Cast

Main cast
 Lucas Neff as James "Jimmy" Chance
 Martha Plimpton as Virginia Chance
 Garret Dillahunt as Burt Chance
 Shannon Woodward as Sabrina Collins
 Gregg Binkley as Barney Hughes
 Cloris Leachman as Barbara June "Maw Maw"/Norma June Thompson

Recurring cast
 Baylie and Rylie Cregut as Hope Chance
 Kate Micucci as Shelley
 Todd Giebenhain as Frank Marolla
 Carla Jimenez as Rosa Flores
 Dan Coscino as Dancin' Dan
 Bijou Phillips as Lucy Carlyle
 Ryan Doom as Wyatt Gill
 Eddie Steeples as Tyler, the Gas Man
 Lou Wagner as Wally Phipps
 Skyler Stone as Mike Chance
 Ethan and Gavin Kent as June Bug

Recurring cast in flashback
 Trace Garcia as 5-year-old Jimmy (credited as Trace!)

Guest cast
 Melanie Griffith as Tamara Jones
 Tippi Hedren as Nana
 Jenny Slate as Joan
 David Ury as Easter Joe
 Leslie Jordan as Reverend Bob
 Wilmer Valderrama as Ricardo
 Chris Klein as Brad Jenkins
 Jeff Harlan as Bill Jenkins
 Mary Gross as Denise Jenkins
 Gary Anthony Williams as Dave Davidson
 Matthew Glave as Big W
 Leann Hunley as Francine
 Christopher Lloyd as Dennis Powers
 Whit Hertford as Ross
 Dale Dickey as Patty
 Greg Germann as Dale Carlyle
 Camden Garcia as Trevor
 Brian Doyle-Murray as Walt
 Matt Winston as Stu
 Emily Rutherfurd as Kelly
 Mike O'Malley as Jim
 Liza Snyder as Christine
 Luke Perry as the Ghost of Arbor Day
 Jason Lee as Smokey Floyd
 Jaime Pressly as Donna
 Ethan Suplee as Andrew
 Nadine Velazquez as Valentina
 Timothy Stack as TV's Tim Stack
 Hilary Duff as Rachel
 Lee Majors as Ralph Chance
 Shirley Jones as Christine Chance

Production
On April 9, 2012, Fox announced that Raising Hope had been renewed for a third season. The season premiered on October 2, 2012. Melanie Griffith will recur in season three, playing the role of Tamara, Sabrina's mother and Melanie Griffith's real life mother, acclaimed Hitchcock actress Tippi Hedren plays Melanie/Tamara's on screen mother as well. Wilmer Valderrama and Leslie Jordan are set to guest star in season three, with Valderrama playing a young man who attempts to woo Sabrina's mother, and Jordan playing the role of Reverend Bob, a spiritual leader known for his unconventional methods. Jenny Slate also guest starred in two episodes as Joan, a social worker who checked on the well-being of baby Jimmy, but instead became concerned with how the family treats Maw Maw. The season premiere was released on the Raising Hope Twitter page prior to the air date.  Fox ordered two more episodes of Raising Hope, bringing the third season to 24 episodes. However, these additional two episodes will now air as part of season four.

Episodes

Ratings

U.S.

References

External links 
 
 List of Raising Hope episodes at MSN TV
 List of Raising Hope episodes at The Futon Critic

2012 American television seasons
2013 American television seasons
Raising Hope